The 1986–87 NBA season was the Hawks' 38th season in the NBA and their 19th season in the city of Atlanta. The Hawks finished first place in the Central Division with a franchise-best record of 57–25. Dominique Wilkins made the All-NBA Second Team, and was selected for the 1987 NBA All-Star Game. In the first round of the playoffs, the Hawks defeated the Indiana Pacers in four games, but lost in five games to the 3rd-seeded Detroit Pistons in the semifinals.

Draft picks

Roster

Regular season

Season standings

Notes
z, y – division champions
x – clinched playoff spot

Record vs. opponents

Game log

Regular season

Playoffs

|- align="center" bgcolor="#ccffcc"
| 1
| April 24
| Indiana
| W 110–94
| Dominique Wilkins (35)
| Tree Rollins (11)
| Spud Webb (9)
| Omni Coliseum16,522
| 0–1
|- align="center" bgcolor="#ccffcc"
| 2
| April 26
| Indiana
| W 94–93
| Dominique Wilkins (43)
| Kevin Willis (10)
| Spud Webb (14)
| Omni Coliseum16,522
| 0–2
|- align="center" bgcolor="#ffcccc"
| 3
| April 29
| @ Indiana
| L 87–96
| Dominique Wilkins (22)
| Kevin Willis (7)
| Doc Rivers (10)
| Market Square Arena12,303
| 2–1
|- align="center" bgcolor="#ccffcc"
| 4
| May 1
| @ Indiana
| W 101–97
| Dominique Wilkins (30)
| Dominique Wilkins (9)
| Doc Rivers (15)
| Market Square Arena14,039
| 3–1
|-

|- align="center" bgcolor="#ffcccc"
| 1
| May 3
| Detroit
| L 111–112
| Kevin Willis (22)
| Kevin Willis (10)
| Doc Rivers (14)
| Omni Coliseum14,361
| 0–1
|- align="center" bgcolor="#ccffcc"
| 2
| May 5
| Detroit
| W 115–102
| Randy Wittman (34)
| Kevin Willis (10)
| Doc Rivers (14)
| Omni Coliseum16,522
| 1–1
|- align="center" bgcolor="#ffcccc"
| 3
| May 8
| @ Detroit
| L 99–108
| Kevin Willis (26)
| Kevin Willis (12)
| Doc Rivers (8)
| Pontiac Silverdome24,544
| 1–2
|- align="center" bgcolor="#ffcccc"
| 4
| May 10
| @ Detroit
| L 88–89
| Wilkins, Battle (19)
| Dominique Wilkins (12)
| Doc Rivers (7)
| Pontiac Silverdome17,269
| 1–3
|- align="center" bgcolor="#ffcccc"
| 5
| May 13
| Detroit
| L 96–104
| Dominique Wilkins (26)
| Dominique Wilkins (12)
| Doc Rivers (15)
| Omni Coliseum16,522
| 1–4
|-

Player statistics

Season

Playoffs

Player Statistics Citation:

Awards and records
Stan Kasten, NBA Executive of the Year Award
Dominique Wilkins, All-NBA Second Team

Transactions

References

See also
1986-87 NBA season

Atlanta Hawks seasons
Atlanta Haw
Atlanta Haw
Atlanta Hawks